Lycian Way Ultramarathon (shortly LYUM) is an international multiday trail running ultramarathon event that takes place across the ancient Lycian region in southwestern Turkey. The Lycian Way Ultramarathon was established in 2010 taking place on October 11–17.

Changing ground conditions such as sandy and rocky trails, dirt roads, slippery terrain in conifer forests and steep slopes make the ultramarathon extremely difficult.

The route starts at Ölüdeniz in Fethiye district of Muğla Province. Following the Turkish Riviera coastline, it passes through Sidyma and then in Antalya Province the places Kaş, Simena, Finike, Olympos and Phaselis. The race ends in Antalya.

The fourth edition of the event in 2013 was cancelled because many foreign ultra runners stayed away or annulled their entry due to perceived risks in connection with the 2013 protests in Turkey and 2012 Syrian–Turkish border clashes. The cancellation caused reaction by local athletes, who had already arranged their training, holiday and airline tickets in accordance with the race term.

Winners
Key:

References

Ultramarathons
Multiday races
Turkish Riviera
Fethiye
Sport in Muğla Province
Sport in Antalya
2010 establishments in Turkey
Annual events in Turkey
Marathons in Turkey
Recurring sporting events established in 2010
Autumn events in Turkey